Mead High School (also Mead Senior High School, MHS) is a four-year public secondary school in Spokane, Washington, United States. MHS is one of two traditional high schools in the Mead School District #354 and has an enrollment of around 1,600. The school colors are navy blue and gold and the mascot is a panther.

Academics 
Beyond required classes in the core academic areas (math, science, social studies, and English), MHS offers a wide variety of elective courses including an honors and Advanced Placement (AP) program, world languages (French, German, and Spanish), physical education, professional/technical education, music, art, and theatre.

Activities and clubs 

According to the school's website, the co-curricular programs (GHQ, drama, music, debate, DECA, leadership, journalism, and Model U.N.) attract the participation of over 700 students each year. The MHS band and choir have also won many awards and are lauded for their performances. The nationally known Mead High School Jazz Ensemble has participated and placed in competitions around the United States. They were selected as one of the top 15 high school jazz bands in the nation and were invited to perform at Lincoln Center as part of the 2004 and 2007 Essentially Ellington festivals. The theater department produces two full-stage productions a year and a musical production once every two years in addition to student-directed one-acts and occasionally hosting a major Northwest theater festival. The theater department have also collaborated with several student musicians to put on a musical called Catch Me if You Can. It was performed for multiple days around November, 2019. The Model U.N. program was represented at the Washington conference at the University of Washington in 2008 by 12 students, and representation was tripled at the Washington conference in 2009.

The Mead High School yearbook (Pantera) is a nationally recognized and award winning program having received several Pacemaker awards from the National Scholastic Press Association as well as Gold and Silver Crowns from Columbia Scholastic Press Association. The 2021 volume received the nations top honors winning a Pacemaker, Gold Crown and Best of Show award at the annual NSPA-JEA Spring Conference in Los Angeles, CA. Following the success of the 2021 volume the book was recognized as being in the top one percent of yearbook programs nationally by Herff Jones. The book is continually featured in the Herff Jones "Portfolio," showcasing the best examples of student journalism nationwide.

The Dance Team is also a nationally awarded team, winning 1st place in the Championship Drill Category and 1st place in the Dance/Drill Category in 2008. 2010 they competed and won 1st in Drill, 1st in Dance, 2nd in Dance/Drill, 3rd in Character, and 4th in Hip Hop.

Athletics 

Mead competes in WIAA Class 3A with the largest schools in the state and is a member of the  Greater Spokane League (GSL). MHS has won 19 state championships (in various sports) in the last 14 years, and has won the Washington All-State trophy six times in that same span, as well as three second-place finishes. The volleyball team won its first 4A state title in 1998 and then took five consecutive from 2003–07. The Panthers won again in 2009 for their seventh state title in 12 seasons, took third in 2011, and second in 2012.

In addition to team championships, the school also has had a number of athletes win individual state championships in wrestling, golf, track & field, and cross-country which has won their 15th state championship this year (2008). Mead men's cross country team has competed in the Nike Team National cross country meet several times. In 2010, the Mead Panther's Track teams (boys and girls) won GSL titles by going the entire season undefeated.

Mead's best-known athletic alums are former Gonzaga star and former Charlotte Bobcats and Los Angeles Lakers player Adam Morrison and former Washington State University and former Detroit Lions kicker Jason Hanson who is currently the 4th all-time NFL leading scorer. Former tennis professional Jan-Michael Gambill also attended Mead High School. Gambill was ranked as high as No. 14 in the world in 2001 and won three ATP tournaments during his career.

Facilities 
MHS completed an extensive remodel; Demolition and construction began in May 1999 and was completed in August 2001. The result is a  facility. The new MHS theatre seats 473 and includes an orchestra pit, excellent lighting, fine acoustics, and views from every seat.

Inside the school, the athletic teams enjoy a gymnasium that seats 2,500, a  field house, and a  weight room, equipped with weight-training and fitness equipment.

Notable alumni 
Lyle Beerbohm, American professional mixed martial arts fighter
Will Brandenburg, World Cup ski racer, class of 2005
Jeff Brown, former professional basketball player, class of 1989
Stacy Clinesmith, former WNBA player, class of 1996.
Amanda Furrer, 2012 Olympian (USA Shooting Team), class of 2009
Jan-Michael Gambill, former ATP tennis pro, class of 1995
Jason Hanson, former NFL placekicker, class of 1988
Jerry Holkins (Penny Arcade (webcomic))
Myles Kennedy (Alter Bridge vocalist/guitarist), class of 1988
Mike Krahulik (Penny Arcade (webcomic))
Craig Montoya (Everclear bassist), class of 1988
Adam Morrison, former NBA guard, class of 2003
Scott Pelluer, former NFL linebacker
Selene Vigil, lead singer of 7 Year Bitch
Cory Withrow, former NFL center, class of 1993

References

External links 

Mead School District #354

High schools in Spokane County, Washington
Mead School District
Schools in Spokane, Washington
Public high schools in Washington (state)